"Birmingham" is a song by Canadian pop-rock singer Amanda Marshall. It was released in 1996 as the second single from her self-titled debut album. The song is her most successful single in Canada, reaching number three on the RPM Top Singles chart, and became her only song to chart on the US Billboard Hot 100, peaking at number 43.

Music video
The song's music video, directed by Jeth Weinrich, mirrors the song's lyrics by featuring a woman fleeing from an abusive relationship. Interspersed throughout the video are clips of Amanda Marshall performing the song. Marshall chose for the video to focus on the woman instead of the man, wanting to create a candid storyline for the female protagonist. Wayne Isaak of VH1 gave the video a positive review, calling the subject matter "empowering".

Track listings

Canadian CD single and US cassette single
 "Birmingham" – 5:21
 "Let's Get Lost" – 4:13

European maxi-CD single
 "Birmingham" (radio edit) – 4:09
 "Beautiful Goodbye" (live at The Spectrum) – 5:51
 "Promises" – 5:22

Australian maxi-CD single
 "Birmingham" (radio edit)
 "Birmingham" (album version)
 "Let It Rain" (live)
 "Fall from Grace" (live)
 "Beautiful Goodbye" (This Could Take All Night)

Charts

Weekly charts

Year-end charts

Release history

References

Amanda Marshall songs
1996 singles
1995 songs
Epic Records singles
Songs about Alabama
Songs about cities in the United States
Songs about domestic violence
Songs written by David Tyson
Songs written by Dean McTaggart